Cynthia Lamptey is a Ghanaian lawyer and public servant. She served as the Director of Public Prosecutions under the John Dramani Mahama administration. She was nominated and subsequently appointed deputy Special Prosecutor of Ghana in 2018. She served as the acting Special Prosecutor of Ghana following the resignation of the then Special Prosecutor, Martin Amidu on 16 November 2020, until the appointment of Kissi Agyebeng on 5 August 2021.

Working life 
Cynthia Lamptey is a lawyer by profession and graduated from the Ghana School of Law. She was employed as a state attorney at the Attorney-General's Department in 1995 and rose through the ranks till she was appointment Director of Public Prosecutions during the John Mahama administration. As the country's chief prosecutor, she handled several high-profile prosecutions. Some of her prosecutions include the case of the alleged stealing of 86.9 million cedis by an Executive Director of the National Service Scheme and the criminal prosecution of  Alfred Agbesi Woyome. Alfred Woyome, a known financier of the National Democratic Congress, was charged by a Ghanaian court of fraudulently receiving a 52 million cedis judgment debt against Ghana. In 2014, prosecuted two Ghanaian women who had played a leading role in the exportation of cocaine to the United Kingdom. After 20 years of service to the nation, she left the department in 2015. She was replaced by Yvonne Attakorah Obuobisa.

Deputy Special Prosecutor of Ghana
In January 2018, after the official appointment of Martin Amidu as Ghana's first Special Prosecutor, the Ghanaian media begun publishing the name of Cynthia Lamptey as his deputy. Cynthia Lamptey had worked under Martin Amidu when the latter was the substantive Attorney General in the John Atta Mills administration. The Office of the Special Prosecutor was created by the Nana Addo Dankwa Akuffo-Addo administration in 2017 with the aim of allowing the independent prosecution of politicians and people affiliated with political parties or their members who are deemed as being corrupt. Following her nomination, she was appointed, she deputy Special Prosecutor in 2018. She then became the first person to be deputy Special Prosecutor of Ghana. She now serves as the acting Special Prosecutor of Ghana after the then Special Prosecutor, Martin Amidu he resigned on 16 November 2020.

References

Living people
Ghanaian women lawyers
Ghana School of Law alumni

Year of birth missing (living people)